Ruth Rivera Felix (born 21 August 1978) was a Puerto Rican female weightlifter, competing in the 63 kg category and representing Puerto Rico at international competitions. 

She participated at the 2000 Summer Olympics in the 63 kg event. 
She competed at world championships, at the 2003 World Weightlifting Championships.

Major results

References

External links
 
http://savannahnow.com/stories/090500/SPTriverafeature.shtml#.WLnqvlXyvIU
http://www.the-sports.org/ruth-rivera-weightlifting-spf394490.html

http://www.gettyimages.com/detail/news-photo/ruth-rivera-of-puerto-rico-fails-to-complete-her-lift-in-news-photo/52034070#ruth-rivera-of-puerto-rico-fails-to-complete-her-lift-in-the-clean-picture-id52034070

1978 births
Living people
People from Caguas, Puerto Rico
Puerto Rican female weightlifters
Weightlifters at the 2000 Summer Olympics
Olympic weightlifters of Puerto Rico
Weightlifters at the 1999 Pan American Games
Weightlifters at the 2003 Pan American Games
Pan American Games competitors for Puerto Rico